Whodunnit? was a British television game show that aired on ITV from 15 August 1972 to 26 June 1978. The show originally aired as a pilot and was hosted by Shaw Taylor. It then became a full show, with the first series being hosted by Edward Woodward and then Jon Pertwee took over hosting duties from the second series until the show's end.

Development 
The armchair detective gameshow was devised by Jeremy Lloyd and Lance Percival.

Multiple panelists (Joanna Lumley, Mollie Sudgen, Robin Nedwell) and suspects (Christopher Biggins) would later appear as characters in the 1990 game show Cluedo, heavily inspired by Whodunnit?.

Format
Each week it featured a short murder-mystery drama enacted in front of a panel of four celebrity guests who then had to establish who the murderer was.
One week there was a smuggling mystery and no murder. The panel members could interview the remaining characters, with the proviso that only the guilty party or parties could lie. Each panelist could also request to see a short replay of one section of the initial drama, which would often include events as they occurred and flashbacks as seen and narrated by individual suspects. For series 1, the entire audience also took part in guessing who was guilty (with the winner winning a prop from the set).

For series 2 and 3, four members of the audience formed a panel, but did not question the suspects, with the winner taking away a 'Whodunnit?' trophy (a magnifying glass in a frame). For series 4 and 5, the audience panel was dropped and a TV Times competition winner formed part of the main panel (taking away a prop from the set if they won the game). For series 6, they were dropped entirely. At the end the compere would reveal the guilty (usually a murderer) with the catchphrase "would the real 'Whodunnit' please stand up?".

Whodunnit? originally adopted a conventional panel-game studio layout, for series 2 some episodes would use the murder scene for the panel part of the show, with this being fully adopted for series 3 onwards. The panelists included regular members such as Patrick Mower, Anouska Hempel, Liza Goddard, Alfred Marks and Magnus Pyke as many well known celebrities such as Honor Blackman, Sheila Hancock, author Jackie Collins, Billie Whitelaw, Barbara Windsor, Joanna Lumley, Terry Wogan, Lindsay Wagner, Lynsey de Paul and George Sewell.

Critical reception 
The Sydney Morning Herald wrote "all the actors look sour and suspect and have dialogue that is bitchily smug", adding that "the acting is corny, but forgivable thanks to the red herrings that lurk behind every remark."

Transmissions

DVD releases
All six series of Whodunnit? have been released on DVD by Network.

Adaptation
A U.S. version of the show ran on NBC from April 12 to May 17, 1979, with Ed McMahon as host.

References

External links
 

1970s British game shows
1970s British mystery television series
1972 British television series debuts
1978 British television series endings
British panel games
English-language television shows
ITV mystery shows
Television series by Fremantle (company)
Television shows produced by Thames Television